This page presents the results of the men's and women's volleyball tournament during the 1979 Pan American Games, which was held in the first two weeks of July, 1979 in Caguas, Puerto Rico.

Men's indoor tournament

Preliminary round robin

Final ranking

Women's indoor tournament

Preliminary round robin

Final ranking

References
 Men's results
 Women's results

Pan American Games
1979 Pan American Games
1979